Moshe Litvak was an Israeli footballer and manager. He is best known for his years at Maccabi Rehovot where he started his managerial career. He also played 6 official matches for the national team between 1949 and 1954.

Playing career
Litvak was born in Rehovot and started playing football with Maccabi Rehovot as a youth. After appearing with Fire Brigade Rehovot in Liga Bet at the age of 14, Litvak returned to Maccabi Rehovot, with whom he played, with an exception of one season, until 1958. In 1955, Litvak took over coaching the team and served as player-manager for the next three years, quitting active play in summer 1958.
Between 1949 and 1954, Litvak played in 6 official matches for the football team, mostly playing as defender. Litvak played in the 1950 and 1954 FIFA World Cup qualification campaigns and took part in the national  team's tour of South Africa, during which the national team played one official match against the host and 10 further matches in South Africa, Southern Rhodesia, Northern Rhodesia and Mozambique.

Coaching career
Litvak started coaching in 1955, serving as a player-manager Maccabi Rehovot. The club dropped to Liga Alef at the end of the 1955–56 season, and Litvak led the team to a second-place finish at the end of the season, which would have been enough to see the club bounce back to the top division. However, due to suspicions of match-fixing during the season, an IFA committee decided to hold a promotion play-off between the top five clubs at the end of the season. Maccabi Rehovot finished fifth in the play-off and remained in Liga Alef.

After leaving Maccabi Rehovot in summer 1958, Litvak coached a string of teams in Liga Leumit, Liga Alef and Liga Bet, winning Liga Alef with Hakoah Tel Aviv in 1961–62 and Hapoel Be'er Sheva in 1970–71. Litvak's last post as head coach was in Maccabi Petah Tikva, from which he resigned in mid-season.

Personal life
Litvak worked in Bank Leumi, progressing to management position before retiring due to old age. Litvak's son, Muli Litvak, is the owner of Coolvision, which operates several websites, among them ImLive.com.

Honours
Liga Alef (second division) (2): 
1961–62 (with Hakoah Tel Aviv), 1970–71 (with Hapoel Be'er Sheva).

References

1926 births
2012 deaths
Israeli Jews
Israeli footballers
Maccabi Rehovot F.C. players
Maccabi Tel Aviv F.C. players
Maccabi Rehovot F.C. managers
Hapoel Rehovot F.C. managers
Shimshon Tel Aviv F.C. managers
Hakoah Tel Aviv F.C. managers
Hakoah Maccabi Ramat Gan F.C. managers
Hapoel Ramla F.C. managers
Hapoel Ramat Gan F.C. managers
Hapoel Kiryat Ono F.C. managers
Hapoel Be'er Sheva F.C. managers
Hapoel Jerusalem F.C. managers
Maccabi Petah Tikva F.C. managers
Association football defenders
Association football forwards
Israeli football managers
Footballers from Rehovot